Procópio Cardoso Neto (born March 21, 1939) is a Brazilian former football player and coach.

He started his professional career at Renascença as a center back. Cardoso also played for 
Belo Horizonte rivals, Cruzeiro and Atlético Mineiro, São Paulo, Fluminense, Vitória and Palmeiras.
In a game of Cruzeiro against Santos for 1968 Taça Brasil Cardoso disputed a ball with Pelé and he had ruptured a tendon in his knee. He spent 5 years out of professional football, working a youth coach at Cruzeiro, returning at field just in 1973.

As a manager, Cardoso managed Cruzeiro, Atlético Mineiro, Atlético Paranaense, Fluminense, Bahia and Internacional.

Honours

Player 
 Atlético Mineiro
 Campeonato Mineiro (2): 1962, 1963

Cruzeiro
 Campeonato Mineiro (6): 1959, 1960, 1961, 1967, 1968, 1973
 Campeonato Brasileiro Série A (1): 1966

 Fluminense
 Campeonato Carioca (1): 1964
 Palmeiras
 Torneio Rio-São Paulo (1): 1965

Como treinador 
 Atlético Mineiro
 Copa Conmebol: 1992
 Campeonato Mineiro (3): 1978, 1979, 1980

References

External links
 

1939 births
Living people
Brazilian footballers
Cruzeiro Esporte Clube players
São Paulo FC players
Clube Atlético Mineiro players
Esporte Clube Vitória players
Fluminense FC players
Sociedade Esportiva Palmeiras players
Clube Atlético Mineiro managers
Al-Arabi SC (Qatar) managers
Qatar national football team managers
Fluminense FC managers
Grêmio Foot-Ball Porto Alegrense managers
Ettifaq FC managers
Sport Club Internacional managers
Esporte Clube Bahia managers
Al Nassr FC managers
América Futebol Clube (MG) managers
Al-Sharjah SCC managers
Association football central defenders
Brazilian football managers